The Royal Belgian Tennis Federation is an organisation set up in 1902 that formally takes charge of tennis in Belgium. From 1979 on, most tasks are executed by the tennis branches of the Flemish and Francophone Communities. The Belgian Federation is one of the 15 inaugural members of the International Tennis Federation. Its headquarters are located in the Brussels Capital Region, in the municipality of Ixelles.

History
On 23 March 1902 the Belgian Lawn Tennis League was founded by 12 tennis clubs. In 1914 the name was changed into Belgian Lawn Tennis Federation and in 1931 the predicate "Royal" was added.

Since 1979, all tennis administration - including the organisation, co-ordination and promotion of tennis - is taken care of by the local leagues of the respective Flemish and Francophone Communities. Tennis Vlaanderen (previously Vlaamse Tennisvereniging) is the Flemish wing, and Association Francophone de Tennis is the association of French-speaking Belgium.

Organisation
The roles of the separate Flemish and Francophone leagues include organising tennis competitions in Belgium, supporting and co-ordinating tennis clubs. At the national level only the Belgian championships for the youth (de Borman Cup) and for veterans are still organised. Since 2005 the Belgian championships for men's and women's tennis are not organised anymore.

At the international level the following tournament delegations are composed by the Belgian Tennis Federation:
 Belgian team at the Davis Cup 
 Belgian team at the Fed Cup 
 Belgian team at the Hopman Cup
If there are games from these tournaments that take place in Belgium, these are alternately organised by Tennis Vlaanderen and the Association Francophone de Tennis.

Chairmen 

 1902 – 1919 Armand Solvay
 1919 – 1924 Albert Lefèbvre–Giron
 1924 – 1948 Paul de Borman
 1948 – 1956 Oscar Bossaert
 1956 – 1974 Marcel Stas de Richelle
 1974 – 1979 Pierre Geelhand de Merxem
 1979 – 1981 Jean-Pierre De Bodt
 1982 – 1982 Roger Tourlamain
 1982 – 1990 Pierre-Paul De Keghel
 1990 – 1995 Henri Denis
 1995 – 2000 Pierre-Paul De Keghel
 2000 – 2005 Yves Freson
 2005 – 2005 Pierre-Paul De Keghel
 2006 – 2010 Luc Vandaele
 2010 – current Yves Freson

References

External links
Official RBTF site
Tennis Vlaanderen
Association Francophone de Tennis

Belgium
Tennis in Belgium
1902 establishments in Belgium
Organisations based in Belgium with royal patronage